Red Church is a former Protestant church in Olomouc, Czech Republic.

The church was built in 1901-1902 by German architect Max Löwe. It was used by local German-speaking Protestant congregation of the German Evangelical Church in Bohemia, Moravia and Silesia. After World War II Germans were expelled and the church was shifted to Czech Protestants. In 1959 it was given to the university library, and it now houses the archives of the Research Library.

References 

 

Churches completed in 1902
20th-century Protestant churches
Churches in Olomouc
Former churches
Former religious buildings and structures in the Czech Republic
20th-century religious buildings and structures in the Czech Republic